Since the Iranian revolution, Iranian female solo vocalists are permitted to perform for female audiences. Female vocalists can perform for male audiences only as a part of a chorus. The prominent classical singer Fatemeh Vaezi, has given concerts accompanied by a female orchestra. She has also performed widely in Europe and the United States. Parisa (Ms. Vaezi's stage name) has also assembled a five-piece female orchestra. 
After 1986 Maryam Akhondy, the classical trained singer from Tehran, started working with other Iranian musicians in exile. With Nawa and Tschakawak she performed in Germany and Scandinavia. At the same time she founded Ensemble Barbad, another group of traditional Iranian art music, which has been touring all over Europe for the past years. In 2000 Maryam Akhondy 
created the all-female a cappella group named Banu as a kind of musical expedition to the different regions and cultures of Iran. For this project Maryam Akhondy, over years, collected old folk songs, which were sung only in private atmosphere, where women are alone or among themselves: at the cradle, doing housework, working in the fields, and women's celebrations. Maryam Akhondy made it her business to bring traditional women’s songs back to life again. 
The well-known classical and folk singer. Sima Bina, who is also a visual artist, has taught many female students how to sing. She has also been permitted to give concerts for women in Iran, and has performed widely abroad.

Ghashang Kamkar teaches both male and female students. Both Ghashang and Parisa have criticized the patriarchal power structure for its primitive treatment of female artists.

A choir for Iranian women with fifty-eight members was established under the Armenian male conductor Gorgin Mousissian. Mousissian's choir, with its repertoire of National songs and folk melodies, performed recently for a mixed male and female audience at Vahdat Hall in Tehran.

Persian classical music 

Qamar ol-Molouk Vaziri is believed to have been the first female master of Persian music to introduce a new style of music and receive a positive reputation among masters of Persian music during her own lifetime.

Several years later, Mahmoud Karimi trained several female students who later became masters of Persian traditional music.
 Maryam Akhondy, founder of Barbad Ensemble and former member of Tschakawak 
 Arfa Atrai, Santur musician and writer
 Soosan Matloobi, Master of Persian classical music
 Fatemeh Vaezi or better known as Parisa, Master of Persian classical music
 Masoomeh Mehr-Ali, Master of Persian classical music
 Soosan Aslani, Master of Persian classical music
 Shakila, singer, winner of Persian Academy Award.
 Delkash
 Simin Ghanem
 Soodabeh Salem, musician and conductor
 Afsaneh Rasaei, member of Hamavayan ensemble
 Pirayeh Pourafar, founder of Nava Ensemble and Lian Ensemble
 Mehrbanou Goudarzi
 Mahsa Vahdat

Iranian folk-music 

Pari Zangeneh
Sima Bina
Darya Dadvar
Mitra Rahbar
Monika Jalili
Ziba Shirazi
Zohreh Jooya
Shushā Guppy

Persian symphonic music 

 Lily Afshar, world class guitarist.
 Afarin Mansouri, composer.

Iranian popular music 

Many female pioneers in Iranian pop music were initially trained in classical Persian music. Maestro Ali Tajvidi in particular trained many female students (e.g.Hayedeh) that later on shifted to popular music. Some pioneers are:

Googoosh
Hayedeh
Mahasti
Leila Forouhar
Maral Salmassi
Pooran
Sima Mafiha
 Faravaz Farvardin

Non Iranian popular music 

Laleh Pourkarim

World music

Azam Ali
Cymin Samawatie

See also 
Music of Iran
Iranian women's movement

Notes

Iranian music
Women in music
Women in Iran